Troi Zee is an American actress and singer best known for her role as Maya in the 2013 drama film 1982 and Amanda in the 2015 drama film Advantageous. Zee garnered recognition for playing Anna in the Nickelodeon animated musical children's television series, Team Umizoomi in 2010.

Biography
Zee began her acting career at The Children's Theatre Company in New York City. She began her career as a singer by launching her original music titled, "Brooklyn Girl".

Filmography

Film

Television

References

External links
 

Living people
American actresses
Year of birth missing (living people)
21st-century American women